The No Exit Tour was a 1998–1999 world tour by American new wave band Blondie to promote their revival and reformation as a band and their latest album No Exit, which was released during the tour. The tour marked the band's first live performances in 16 years, save for small festival appearances in 1997.

Background
The tour was announced in 1998 and 1999, with tickets going on sale soon after the announcements. The second leg of the North American dates was announced through NBC's Today Show in June 1999.

The 13-month-long tour visited venues across Europe, with a UK and Ireland leg, Australia, before progressing to North America for the 1999 dates, with the USA leg beginning with a heavily promoted 'Blondie's Back' concert on the same day as the release of the album No Exit.

Several songs recorded during the tour were released as No Exit single's B-sides and bonus tracks on several editions of the album itself. Elements of five individual shows were later collected together into the 1999 Live live album. Blondie's performance on February 23, 1999 at New York's Town Hall was released on the Live video album.

Set list

Tour dates

Notes

Personnel
Debbie Harry – vocals
Chris Stein – guitars
Clem Burke – drums
Jimmy Destri – keyboards
Paul Carbonara – guitars
Leigh Foxx – bass
Peter Danilowitz - auxiliary keyboards
Matt O'Connor - auxiliary percussion

Notes

References

Blondie (band) concert tours
1998 concert tours
1999 concert tours